Pod Meets World is a podcast hosted by Rider Strong, Danielle Fishel, and Will Friedle. The hosts rewatch episodes of their 1990s sitcom Boy Meets World, share behind-the-scenes memories, and interview other actors and producers who were involved with Boy Meets World.

The podcast premiered on June 26, 2022. It is produced by iHeartPodcasts.

Production
According to Danielle Fishel, Rider Strong first had the idea for the podcast in 2019. Though Ben Savage was initially in discussions to co-host the podcast, he ultimately decided not to. Fishel said in 2022, "And so we talked about all the different ways we could do it. And at the end of our conversations, Ben said, 'I just don't think it's for me.' And we get it. So we're respecting his decision. And if he eventually wants to come on, we'll leave that door open."

Episodes of the podcast are either interviews or discussions of an episode of the series. According to Rider Strong, he had not seen many episodes of the series since they first aired in the 1990s. For the podcast, Strong is rewatching the episodes with his son, and the podcast sometimes features recordings of Strong's son's reaction to the episodes.

Reception
The podcast has received mostly positive reviews. Avery Thompson of Hollywood Life called it "the podcast we didn't know we needed."

Episodes

References

2022 podcast debuts
Comedy and humor podcasts
Film and television podcasts
Audio podcasts
American podcasts
Boy Meets World